Heinz Hofmann (1917 – after 1967) was a German conductor. After artistic engagements with the Philharmonisches Staatsorchester Halle and the Südwestdeutsche Philharmonie Konstanz, he was most recently permanent conductor of the Tokyo Metropolitan Symphony Orchestra.

Life 
Hofmann was born in 1917 as the son of a chamber musician in Wrocław and grew up in Halle and Dresden. After the Abitur, he attended the orchestral school of the Staatskapelle Dresden. There he was a pupil of Hermann Ludwig Kutzschbach. In 1939, he was drafted into the Luftwaffe of the Wehrmacht. He became a US prisoner of war, which he remained until 1946.

Under Walter Schartner in 1949/50, he was initially deputy principal conductor and after his departure in 1950, he became provisional principal conductor of the Philharmonisches Staatsorchester Halle. Schartner's official successor became Werner Gößling.

In 1953, Hofmann moved to the BRD "because of political danger", as he stated. After being selected from a group of guest conductors, he succeeded music director Richard Treiber at the Constance Municipal Orchestra (from 1962 Südwestdeutsche Philharmonie Konstanz) in 1959 (from 1962, the Southwest German Philharmonic Orchestra of Constance), whose position had already been advertised since 1956. According to Robert Heinze, "a personal feud" between a concert pianist who had probably been passed over and the music director led to a scandal. Hofmann was reproached for falsely holding the title of Generalmusikdirektor, which he had never received in the GDR. A reticent city and the realities of  did not help to quickly clarify the facts of the case.

After his call to Tokyo, Hofmann resigned from Konstanz and worked from 1965 to 1967 as one of two Permanent Conductors of the newly founded Tokyo Metropolitan Symphony Orchestra.

Recordings 
 Felix Mendelssohn Bartholdy: Violin Concerto E minor (Saphir 1977) with the Südwestdeutsche Philharmonie Konstanz and Wolfgang Marschner

Further reading 
 Susanne Baselt: Chronik des Philharmonischen Staatsorchesters Halle. Part I: 1946 bis 1964. Published by the Directorate of the Halle Philharmonic State Orchestra, Halle (Saale) 1999, .
 Robert Heinze: Vom Theaterorchester zum internationalen Klangkörper. Zum 75-jährigen Jubiläum der Südwestdeutschen Philharmonie. (Kleine Schriftenreihe des Stadtarchivs Konstanz, vol. 6). UVK Verlagsgesellschaft, Konstanz 2007, pp. 57 ff.

References

External links 
 
 

20th-century German conductors (music)
German prisoners of war
1917 births
Date of death unknown
Musicians from Wrocław